The Battle of Malpura was a battle in 1800 between the Kingdom of Jaipur and supported by the Kingdom of Marwar against the Kingdom of Gwalior. It was the result of a crisis between the governments of the two sides.

Background
In 1800, a crisis developed between Jaipur and Gwalior Scindia`s Government. The main reasons behind it were:
 Burden of more money on Rajput kings annoyed them.
 Rajputs sensed opportunity in the civil war between Scindhia and Holkar in Poona.
 There was same internal conflict in Daulat Rao Sindhia's administration. The feud between the widow of Mahadaji and disruption by his old servant and such condition ensured that Scindia remained in the limit of north India.

Sawai Pratap Singh made an attempt to profit from these internal dissensions of his Scindia rivals prior to the Battle of Malpura. In March 1800, he openly rejected the money clauses of the treaty of 1791 (signed after the Battle of Patan and started to prepare for war. Pratap Singh asked all the Rajput Rajas to join him, but the Maharaja of Marwar was the only one who answered, as the Rathors were eager to win back the territories they had lost to the Sindhias. 5000 Rathor horsemen were sent from the capital of Jodhpur under the command of Sawai Singh Rathor to assist Sawai Pratap Singh. The Jaipur raja gathered an army of his clansmen along with Gosains, Rohillas and irregulars while the Gwalior army had the Campoos infantry, made-up of Rajputs and muslims, and a contingent of Maratha cavalry to support them. The two armies met at Malpura, thus paving the way for the battle.

Battle
The battle was started by a charge of the Rathor cavalry which broke the left wing of the Maratha army. Captain Paish and several officers were killed and Dudrence saved himself by hiding under the corpses of his men. The victorious Rathors then charged on the Maratha cavalry that was the second line of battle order. Here the Maratha cavaliers did not wait to meet the shock but "ran away like sheep", the Rathors pursued them for two miles to the rear". Pohlmen who was in right wing, was however able to control the situation and was able to successfully repel several charges made by the Kachwaha cavalry on the right wing. The Kachwaha Raja after suffering heavy losses, mounted a horse and retreated with his army. The Rathors after returning from their charge, thought that they had won the battle and mistook the Gwalior army as their Jaipur allies, they were caught unaware and shot down in great numbers and those who were able to break through the lines were bayoneted by Skinner's men.

Battle events described by Skinner
James Skinner has described the Rathor charge that took place in the beginning of the battle:"The Rathors were seen approaching from a distance, the tramp of their immense and compact body rising like thunder above the roar of battle, they came on first a slow hand gallop, which increased in speed as they approached, the well served guns of the brigade showered grape upon their dense mass, cutting down hundreds at each discharge, but this had no effect in arresting their progress, on they came, like a whirlwind, trampling 1500 of their own body, destroyed by the cannons of the brigade, neither the murderous volleys from the musket, nor the serried hedge of bayonets, could check or shake them, they poured like a torrent on and over the brigade, and rode it fairly down, leaving scarce a vestige of it remaining."

According to Skinner, the battle between the Jaipur Raja and Pohlmen which had become very bloody after a fight of one n half hours, forcing the Jaipur raja to personally lead his horsemen on an elephant:"The raja now approached us within two or three hundred yards, when we gave them a salvo, which brought his elephant down. The (Kachwaha) horse twice attempted to charge us, but were beaten off with great slaughter. On this the raja mounted his horse, and retired. The (Kachwaha) horse went off along with him."

Regarding the aftermath of the battle, Skinner recounted that at "about 9 o'clock the field began to clear, but the Rathors had not yet returned from their chase, they had driven the whole Maratha cavalry several kos. In a few hours we saw their dust, and found that they were returning in a gol (victory formation), nakarras (Indian Drums) beating victory. They took us for the Jaipur infantry, but they soon found out their mistake, from receiving a discharge of grape from 30 pieces of cannon. Twice they charged us, and though each time repulsed, several broke into our squares, and were bayoneted there. At last the survivors returned to their camp."

References

Malpura
History of Rajasthan
History of Gwalior
1800 in India